Gathercole is an English surname which originated, in the Early Medieval period, as a nickname for an old man who "gathered cold", and consequently weakness.

Notable persons with the surname include:

Ben Gathercole (born 1965), Australian triathlon coach
Cory Gathercole (born 1986), Australian motorcycle speedway rider 
Harry Gathercole (1887–1953), Australian footballer
John Gathercole (1937–2010), Archdeacon of Dudley
Simon J. Gathercole, British New Testament scholar
Susan Gathercole, British psychologist
Terry Gathercole (1935–2001), Australian swimmer

References

English-language surnames